is a 1987 Japanese pink film directed by Tomoaki Hosoyama.

Synopsis
Two lesbian lovers (Reika Kano and Kyōko Hashimoto) escape the city to commit a lovers-suicide deep in the forest. There they are captured by the queen (Chiemi Akimoto) of a lesbian colony who uses the two lovers for her own sex games. The couple organize a revolt against the queen.

Cast
 Reika Kano as Iori
 Yuriko Kyōtoku as Yui
 Kumi Uesugi as M.P.
 Noriko Kikuchi as Michiko
 Kyōko Hashimoto as An
 Chiemi Akimoto as Queen
 Itsumi Shikata as Shima
 Mirai Akiyama as Lady-in-Waiting
 Tomomi Matsuda as M.P.

Background
Tomoaki Hosoyama filmed Lesbian Harem for Shintōhō Eiga and it was released theatrically in Japan by that studio on April 18, 1987. U.S. low-budget exploitation films had become popular in Japan with the advent of home video. Director Hosoyama made Lesbian Harem on a similarly low budget, and designed the film as a tribute to these films, and particularly as an homage to John Waters' Desperate Living (1977).

In their Japanese Cinema Encyclopedia: The Sex Films, Thomas and Yuko Mihara Weisser give Lesbian Harem three out of four stars. Noting that Lesbian Harem is an important film on its own, they point out that in many ways this early Hosoyama film also anticipates his later hit, Weather Girl (1993). Hosoyama's attitude towards lesbianism, in particular, is shared between these films, and in direct opposition to the way it was depicted in most contemporary pink films dealing with the subject. Rather than showing lesbians as women who are bitter from bad experiences with heterosexual affairs, and who are victims of a disapproving society, Hosoyama shows lesbianism simply as a lifestyle which the storyline accepts without judgment.

Bibliography

English

Japanese

Notes

1987 films
1980s Japanese-language films
Pink films
Shintōhō Eiga films
Japanese LGBT-related films
1987 LGBT-related films
1980s Japanese films